The Gat Perich International Humor Prize, (Premi Internacional d'Humor Gat Perich) is an international award to cartoonists or humorists given in memory of Spanish cartoonist Jaume Perich (1941–1995).

It has been awarded since 1995. The prize consists in a silver figure of one of the famous cats drawn by Perich, holding a pencil. It has also been awarded at the Gat Perich Honours Awards series, recognising the career and work of veteran cartoonists and humorists who have become benchmarks for the contemporary generations.

Gat Perich Awards winners 
 1996 - Plantu (Jean Plantureux)
 1997 - El Roto (Andrés Rábago)
 1998 - Georges Wolinski
 1999 - Miguel Gila
 2000 - Forges (Antonio Fraguas)
 2001 - Antonio Mingote
 2002 - Gallego & Rey (José Maria Gallego & Julio Rey) 
 2003 - Miquel Ferreres
 2004 - Toni Batllori
 2005 - Fer (Josep Antoni Fernández)
 2006 - Pepe Rubianes
 2007 - Kim (Joaquim Aubert)
 2008 - Marjane Satrapi
 2009 - Kap (Jaume Capdevila)

Honorary Gat Perich Awards winners 
 1997 - Gin (Jordi Ginés)
 2002 - Cesc (Francesc Vila)
 2003 - Alfons Figueras
 2007 - Joaquim Muntañola
 2008 - Máximo San Juan
 2009 - Andreu Buenafuente Moreno

References

Editorial cartooning awards
Awards established in 1996